Sudan Airways Flight 2241 was a scheduled cargo flight from Sharjah, United Arab Emirates to Khartoum, Sudan operated by a Boeing 707-330C which crashed on 21 October 2009.

Aircraft and crew
The aircraft involved was Boeing 707-330C ST-AKW. The aircraft was s/n 20112, line number 788. The aircraft first flew on 1 May 1968 and was delivered to Lufthansa on 17 February 1969 where it was registered D-ABUJ. From 23 March 1977, it was leased to Condor until it was sold to the United Arab Emirates on 5 May 1981. The aircraft was re-registered A6-DPA. On 26 May 1986, the aircraft was sold to the Sudanese Government and re-registered ST-AKW. On 26 October 1986, it was sold to Nile Safaris Aviation, serving until sold to Trans Arabian Air Transport on 28 May 1992. The final change of ownership was on 16 August 1994 when it was sold to Azza Transport.

The captain, age 61, had previously worked for Sudan Airways and had 19,943 flight hours, but his experience on the Boeing 707 was not stated. The first officer, age 34, had 6,649 flight hours, including 5,011 hours on the Boeing 707. The flight engineer, age 53, had 7,324 flight hours, all of which were on the Boeing 707.

Accident

The flight was destined for Khartoum International Airport and had just taken off at the time of the accident. The aircraft was carrying a cargo of air conditioning units, car parts, computers and tools. It is reported that a piece of the aircraft fell off shortly after it became airborne. This was later identified as a part of a cowling from one of the engines. The aircraft was totally destroyed in the crash and subsequent fire which killed all six crew on board.

Investigation

Sheik Khalid Al-Qasimi stated that the General Civil Aviation Authority (GCAA) of the United Arab Emirates launched an investigation into the crash. It is reported that one area of inquiry is the engines. The Cockpit Voice Recorder and Flight Data Recorder were recovered and sent to the United Kingdom for analysis. In February 2010, it was reported that both recorders were not functioning, and no data was recovered from them. In January 2011, the GCAA released an interim report. An engine cowling fell away from the No. 4 engine shortly after take off. The final report stated the cause of the accident was the aircraft exceeding the maximum bank angle.  This caused a stall and loss of control that was not recoverable.  The crew were responding to a perceived power loss of engine #4, although their response was inappropriate.  The #4 engines core cowls departed from the engine and this led to the separation of the Engine Pressure Ratio flex line.

Consequences
Azza Transport was banned from operating in the United Arab Emirates while the investigation into the accident took place.

References

External links

General Civil Aviation Authority
Interim Report (Archive)
Video of the aftermath
Photo history of ST-AKW from Airliners.net

Aviation accidents and incidents in 2009
2009 in the United Arab Emirates 
Accidents and incidents involving the Boeing 707
Aviation accidents and incidents in the United Arab Emirates
October 2009 events in Asia
2009 disasters in the United Arab Emirates